USCGC Rush (WHEC-723) was a United States Coast Guard high endurance  cutter. The ship was named after Secretary of the Treasury Richard Rush. Rush was launched on November 16, 1968, commissioned on July 3, 1969, and was decommissioned on February 3, 2015 after 45 years of Coast Guard service.

History

Construction
As all Hamilton-class cutters, Rush was constructed at Avondale Shipyard near New Orleans, Louisiana and launched November 16, 1968, she was the fifth Coast Guard Cutter to be named after Secretary of the Treasury Richard Rush, the nation's eighth Secretary of Treasury.

Record Storm
During the 1970's Rush was based out of Alameda Island in San Francisco Bay and performed regular patrols of Alaskan waters and the Bering Sea. Rush has the distinction of having ridden out "the most powerful storm, at least in terms of depth of pressure, to affect Alaska in modern history" of October 25, 1977.  As the storm built, the bridge crew recorded a atmospheric pressure  drop of one inch in twenty minutes. Under command of Captain Norman E. Fernald, Rush sustained damage to her sonar dome and superstructure, but completed her patrol.  During the storm the decision was made to turn the Rush to take a following sea. The crew was sent to general quarters and the con was given to the Operations Officer, Lt. Paul Lundgren, who accomplished the turn on the side of a single wave.

Eastwood affair

The Rush assisted in the rescue of the East Wood affair, an incident of piracy in early 1993 aboard the cargo ship East Wood (also Eastwood). Chinese illegal immigrants took control of East Wood before she was taken back by her crew.

Decommissioning
On February 3, 2015, the United States Coast Guard officially decommissioned Rush with a ceremony held in Honolulu, Hawaii.

Bangladesh Navy
The Coast Guard has transferred Rush (now ) to the Bangladesh Navy as part of a Foreign Military Sale through the Foreign Assistance Act.

Rush is the Bangladesh Navy's second Hamilton-class cutter acquisition. Jarvis is now named . The Bangladesh Navy designates these former Hamilton-class cutters as "patrol frigates."

Awards
USCGC Rush has earned numerous awards.  Many of the ship's awards were earned for participation in the Vietnam War, as part of Operation Market Time. Awards listed were current to May 2014.

Notes

References
United States Coast Guard. (2008). Medals and Awards Manual: COMDTINST M1650.25D. Washington, DC, U.S. Government Printing Office.

External links

 

Ships of the United States Coast Guard
Hamilton-class cutters
1968 ships
Maritime incidents in 1993
Ships built in Bridge City, Louisiana
Ships transferred from the United States Coast Guard to the Bangladesh Navy